The Hain-Harrelson House is a historic house in Sardis, Alabama.  The Classical Revival style structure was completed in 1913 for J. Bruce Hain on his working plantation.  The house contains roughly  spread over two floors.  The interior is divided on a central hall plan. The front exterior is adorned with a monumental two-story Corinthian portico with a full-width second floor balcony.  The house sat vacant for more than two decades until it was purchased by Cecil Gayle and Kenneth Parker of Atlanta in 1998.  They stabilized and restored the home to its original condition.  It was added to the National Register of Historic Places on November 30, 2001. The home was purchased in December 2015 by Ray and Angie Harrelson of Selma, AL.

References

National Register of Historic Places in Dallas County, Alabama
Houses on the National Register of Historic Places in Alabama
Neoclassical architecture in Alabama
Houses completed in 1913
Houses in Dallas County, Alabama
1913 establishments in Alabama